Baranikha is a rural locality (a village) in Kharovskoye Rural Settlement, Kharovsky District, Vologda Oblast, Russia. The population was 270 as of 2002. There are 4 streets.

Geography 
Baranikha is located 3 km northeast of Kharovsk (the district's administrative centre) by road. Ivanikovo is the nearest rural locality.

References 

Rural localities in Kharovsky District